Gyula Koi (born April 21, 1977, Budapest) is a Hungarian legal scholar and lecturer. His main research fields are administrative law, and theory of public administration. His Chinese name is Guo Yi.

Biography
Koi graduated in 2002 with a BA in Public Administration from the Corvinus University of Budapest, and an MA in Law from University of Szeged in 2010. From 2007 to 2009, he studied sinology at Eötvös Loránd University. In 2014, he obtained a doctoral degree from Széchenyi István University (Győr) writing a thesis entitled, 'Foreign influences in Hungarian Public Administration.' From 2002 to 2003, he was Head Librarian at the EU Documentation and Research Center in the Faculty of Law. From 2003 to 2005, he was Assistant Lecturer at Corvinus University of Budapest, Dept. of Public Administration. In 2005 he became Assistant Fellow at the Institute for Legal Studies of Center for Social Sciences, Hungarian Academy of Sciences. In 2014, he became Research Fellow at the Institute. From 2005, he worked at the Hungarian Parliament (Committee of Immunity), focusing on 'Code of Conduct for MPs'. From 2009, he became editor-in-chief of 'Jogi Tudósító' (Legal Correspondent). iN  2012, he became Assistant Lecturer at National University of Public Service, Faculty of Public Administration, Institute for Public Law. In 2014, he became a lecturer at this university. Number of his published papers are more than 160. The number of his papers in Foreign Languages (English, French, German, Slovak and Ukrainian) are 22.
Number of his citations is 130 to 35 publications.

Selected publications

Books
Magyary Zoltán összes munkái (1919-1922). Kritikai kiadás. [The Oeuvre of Zoltán Magyary (1919-1922). Critical Edition.] /Sorozatszerk.: Patyi, András. Vál., összeáll., előtan.: Koi,Gyula. Lekt.: Máthé, Gábor/. [Series editor: András Patyi. Critical editor: Gyula Koi. Revised by: Gábor Máthé]. Budapest: Nemzeti Közszolgálati Egyetem, 2015. 237 p.  
A közigazgatás-tudományi nézetek fejlődése. Külföldi hatások a magyar közigazgatási jog és a közigazgatástan művelésében a kameralisztika időszakától a Magyary-iskola koráig. [On the Development of Thought in Science of Public Administration. Foreign Influences in Hungarian Administrative Law and Study of Public Administration from the Times of Cameralism to the Era of Magyary School]. Budapest: Nemzeti Közszolgálati és Tankönyv Kiadó Zrt., 2014. 487 p. 
Évszázadok mezsgyéjén. Négy magyar közigazgatás-tudós útkeresése és életpéldája. Zsoldos Ignác (1803-1885) Récsi Emil (1822-1864) Concha Győző (1846-1933) Magyary Zoltán (1888-1945). [On the Confine of Centuries. Path-finding and Careers of Four Hungarian Administrative Legal Scholars]. Budapest: Nemzeti Közszolgálati és Tankönyv Kiadó Zrt., 2013. 178 p.

Edited Books
Patyi, András-Rixer, Ádám (eds.)-Koi, Gyula (co-ed.): Hungarian Public Administration and Administrative Law. Passau: Schenk Verlag GmbH, 2014. 552 p. 
Az Európai Unió tagállamainak közigazgatása. /The Administration of EU Member States/. (Eds.: Balázs, István-Gajduschek, György-Koi, Gyula-Szamel, Katalin). Complex Wolters Kluwer, Budapest, 2011. 970. 
OECD: Hogyan korszerűsítsük a közigazgatást? A követendő út. /Original title: Modernising Government. The Way Forward./ (Transl.: Kincses, László-Koi, Gyula; technical editor: Koi, Gyula). OECD, Budapest, 2009. 291.

Book chapters, articles
Public-Private Partnership in Hungary. (With András Torma and András Zs. Varga). In: Partenariats public-privé: rapports du XVIIIe congrès de l’Académie Internationale de Droit Comparé / Public-Private Partnership: Reports of the XVIIIth Congress of the International Academy of Comparative Law (ed.: François Lichére). Bruylant, Brussels, 2011. 353-395. 
Ausländische Wirkungen in der ungarischen Verwaltungswissenschaft. In: Lukas, S.S. (ed.): Держава и право: проблеми становлення и стратегия розвитку. Збірник матеріалів V Міжнародної науково-практичної конференції I частина 19 – 20 травня 2012 р. Суми - Sumy, 2012. 298-302. ТОВ "Друкарський дім "Папірус" - TOV Drukarskij dim "Papirus".
Le légisme dans la littérature de la sinologie anglaise, francaise, allemande, et russe. In: Gerencsér, Balázs-Takács, Péter (eds.): Ratio Legis-Ratio Iuris. Liber Amicorum Studia A. Tamás Septuagenario Dedicata. Szent István Társulat, Budapest, 2011. 518-523. 
Democratism in Hungarian public administration. In: Держава и право: проблеми становлення и стратегия розвитку. Збірник матеріалів IV Мижнародної науково-практичної конференції, присвяченої 20-й річниці незалежності України та 20-й річниці заснуванная інституту президенства в України (Суми, 21-22 травная 2011 р.). Унсверситетска книга, Суми, 2011. 149-150.
Good manners and good faith as a problem of civil service ethics. In: Horecky, J.-Kovacova, L.-Vomacka, V.-Zatecka, E. (eds.): COFOLA 2011. The Conference Proceedings. Masaryk University, Brno, 2011. 79-84. .
Le droit international public et la Chine. La Chine pendant la dynastie Qing (la Chine impériale) et pendant la République populaire de Chine. In: Nótári, Tamás-Török, Gábor (eds.): Prudentia Iuris Gentium Potestate. Ünnepi tanulmányok Lamm Vanda tiszteletére. (Liber Amicorum Vanda Lamm.) Institute for Legal Studies of HAS, Budapest, 2010. 253-261. 
The First Three Decades of Legal Reforms in the People's Republic of China. Acta Juridica Hungarica Vol. LII. No. 4. (2011) 348-367.

References 
Citations

Bibliographies

Koi Gyula. (Entry.) In: Pablényi, Attila (ed.): Ki kicsoda a magyar közigazgatásban 2006. [Who's who in Hungarian Public Administration?] Budapest, 2006. 94. DFT-Hungária. 
Koi Gyula. (Entry.) In: Radosiczky, Imre (ed.): Ki kicsoda a magyar oktatásban II. Felsőoktatás, felnöttképzés, szakképzés és nyelviskolák. [Who's who in Hungarian education II. Higher education, adult education, vocational training, and language schools.] Budapest, 2006. 288. FISZ. 
Imre, Miklós: Államigazgatási Tanszék. (Department of Public Administration - Koi Gyula.) In: Orosz, Ágnes (ed.): A Budapesti Corvinus Egyetem Közigazgatás-tudományi Karának (Államigazgatási Főiskola) története 1977-2007. [The history of Corvinus University of Budapest /BUESPA/, Faculty of Public Administration (National School of Public Administration) 1977-2007]. Budapest, 2007. 44. HVG-ORAC Lap-és Könyvkiadó Kft. 
A Közigazgatás-tudományi Kar (Államigazgatási Főiskola) végzett hallgatói. [The graduated students of Faculty of Public Administration (former National School of Public Administration)]. In: Orosz, Ágnes (ed.): A Budapesti Corvinus Egyetem Közigazgatás-tudományi Karának (Államigazgatási Főiskola) története 1977-2007. [The history of Corvinus University of Budapest /BUESPA/, Faculty of Public Administration] [National School of Public Administration] 1977-2007. Budapest, 2007. 223-351. HVG-ORAC Lap-és Könyvkiadó Kft.  (On Koi, see: page 296, column 1, on top name number 17.).
Főszerkesztői bemutatkozás. (The Introduction of the Editor-in-Chief /Gyula Koi/.) Jogi Tudósító [Legal Correspondent] Vol. 40 (2009) No. 11. 3.

Interviews
Lengyel, Tibor: Dokumentációs központok. /Documentation Centers./ - Interview with Gyula Koi. Népszava, 28 February 2003.
Előházi, Zsófia: A kari Dokumentációs Központ. (Interjú a Központ könyvtárosával, Koi Gyulával). [The (EU) Documentation Center of the Faculty. Interview with the Head Librarian of the Center, Gyula Koi]. Jurátus, Vol. 23 (15 September 2003) No. 1.
Előházi, Zsófia: Helyben olvasható EU-s tudás. Lépéselőnyben a jogászok. [Knowledge on EU - Read on site. Lawyers in one step ahead. -Interview with Gyula Koi]. Népszabadság Diploma melléklet [Népszabadság - Special Issue on Diplomas], 8 October 2003.
Farkas, János: Etikai kódex a honatyák magatartásáról. [Code of Conduct for the Members of Parliament.] - Interview with Gyula Koi. Kisalföld, 12 April 2006.

Discussion papers on Koi's academic writings
Fogarasi, József: Hozzászólás Koi Gyula: „Töprengés a közszolgálati etika és a közszolgálati etikai kódex aktuális problémáin” című cikkéhez. [Post on paper of Gyula Koi: "Meditation on Actual Problems of Civil Service Ethics and Code of Conducts for Civil Servants."] Magyar Közigazgatás, Vol. 53 No. 4. (April 2003.) 250-251.

External links 
 His works in Western languages in Google Scholar.
 http://www.mta-ius.hu/page_2_hu/koi_gyula.htm?picture=pic1
 The title of dr. Fogarasi's discussion paper in the author's own website (point 5.71.)

Academic staff of the National University of Public Service
Hungarian legal scholars
Hungarian jurists
1977 births
Living people
Public administration scholars
Scholars of Chinese law
University of Szeged alumni
Corvinus University of Budapest alumni